The 1993 Japan rugby union tour of Wales was a series of matches played in September and October 1993 in Wales by Japan national rugby union team.

Results 
Scores and results list Japan's points tally first.

References
 

 

Japan rugby union tour
Japan national rugby union team tours
Rugby union tours of Wales
tour
1993 in Japanese sport
Japan